A significant controversy exists over Germany's Bundeswehr's use of Erwin Rommel as its role model. Numerous critics take issue with the Bundeswehr's reverence towards Rommel as its primary role model. While recognizing his great talents as a commander, they point out several problems, including Rommel's involvement with a criminal regime and his political naivete. However, there are also many supporters of the continued commemoration of Rommel by the Bundeswehr, and there remains military buildings and streets named after him and portraits of him displayed.

Critics of Rommel's commemoration by the Bundeswehr
The politician scientist  calls for his replacement with Manfred von Richthofen. Cornelia Hecht opines that whatever judgement history will pass on Rommel – who was the idol of World War II as well as the integration figure of the post-war Republic – it is now the time in which the Bundeswehr should rely on its own history and tradition, and not any Wehrmacht commander. , a retired Bundeswehr officer, writes that the maintenance of the Rommel barracks' names and the definition of Rommel as a German resistance fighter are capitulation before neo-Nazi tendencies. Heiducoff agrees with Bundeswehr generals that Rommel was one of the greatest strategists and tacticians, both in theory and practice, and a victim of contemporary jealous colleagues, but argues that such a talent for aggressive, destructive warfare is not a suitable model for the Bundeswehr, a primarily defensive army. Heiducoff criticizes Bundeswehr generals for pressuring the Federal Ministry of Defence into making decisions in favour of the man who they openly admire. The Green Party's position is that Rommel was not a war criminal but still had entanglements with war crimes, and that he cannot not be the Bundeswehr's role model. The political scientist and politician Alexander Neu criticises the Ministry's undeterred attitude to the fact Rommel was at least near-Nazi and did serve the unjust regime, and comments that the association of Rommel with the spirit of the Bundeswehr is not new, but they did not expect that the Federal Ministry of Defence, without providing at least a bibliography, would declare him a victim of the regime as well.

Supporters
Historian Michael Wolffsohn supports the Ministry of Defense's decision to continue recognition of Rommel, although he thinks the focus should be put on the later stage of Rommel's life, when he began thinking more seriously about war and politics, and broke with the regime. Mitteldeutscher Rundfunk (MDR) reports that, "Wolffsohn declares the Bundeswehr wants to have politically thoughtful, responsible officers from the beginning, thus a tradition of 'swashbuckler' and 'humane rogue' is not intended". According to authors like Ulrich vom Hagen and Sandra Mass though, the Bundeswehr (as well as NATO) deliberately endorses the ideas of chivalrous warfare and apolitical soldiering associated with Rommel. According to Cornelia Hecht, the Bundeswehr believes that "chivalry and fairness", which Rommel embodied more than any other Wehrmacht generals, are timeless military virtues. At a Ministry conference soliciting input on the matter, Dutch general Ton van Loon advised the Ministry that, although there can be historical abuses hidden under the guise of military tradition, tradition is still essential for the esprit de corps, and part of that tradition should be the leadership and achievements of Rommel. Historian Christian Hartmann opines that not only Rommel's legacy is worthy of tradition but the Bundeswehr "urgently needs to become more Rommel".
The Field Marshal Rommel Barracks, Augustdorf stresses his leadership and performance as worthy of tradition and identity, establishing, among other things, Rommel having committed no proven war crime as a reason to keep the name. The Sanitary Regiment 3, stationed at the Rommel Barracks in Dornstadt, also desires (almost unanimously, as revealed by an interdepartmental opinion poll) to keep the name. There has also been discussion regarding the Hammelburg Garrison ("the heart of German infantry", according to von der Leyen), which considers Rommel as "name patron" and "identification figure" together with Adolf Heusinger (the main street on which the garrison is located is named after Rommel while one of the barracks is named after Heusinger). The city council has defended the street's name. 

The Parliamentary Commissioner for the Armed Forces Hans-Peter Bartels (SPD) supports the keeping of the name and the tradition associated with Rommel, but notes that the reasons should not be his initial successes in the North African campaign (1940-1943), or that the former adversary armies have continued to worship him until this day. Bartels adds that Rommel, who probably supported the Resistance, is a borderline case, regarding which historians find it hard to ascertain, and German history is full of such ambiguities. In early 2017, the German Federal Ministry of Defence, in response to a petition championed by historian Wolfgang Proske and backed by politicians from the Left Party, defended the naming of barracks after Rommel, with the justification that the current state of research does not support their allegations. In 2019, the Parliamentary Commissioner for the Armed Forces and the Ministry of Defence explained that although there are controversies regarding Rommel's role in the resistance against National Socialism, Rommel did disregard criminal orders and reject the enemy image enforced by the regime. Additionally, the Bundeswehr also finds his courage in trying to end the war meaningful and worthy of tradition. 
Sönke Neitzel supports the commemoration, although he notes that Rommel "rode the waves of the regime" and only mustered the courage to break with it at the last minute, but in a way unlike any other general. He also considers Rommel's other virtues and military capability to be important, since membership of the resistance does not help modern soldiers in Mali. Historian Hannes Heer argues that Rommel was not a resistance fighter, and that membership of the resistance, instead of secondary virtues and military capability, should be the only touchstone of commemoration.

Alternative views
Historian Johannes Hürter opines that instead of being the symbol for an alternative Germany, Rommel should be the symbol for the willingness of the military elites to become instrumentalised by the Nazi authorities. As for whether he can be treated as a military role model, Hürter writes that each soldier can decide on that matter for themselves. Historian  argues that it is totally conceivable that the Resistance saw Rommel as someone with whom they could build a new Germany. According to Piper though, Rommel was a loyal national socialist without crime rather than a democrat, thus unsuitable to hold a central place among role models, although he can be integrated as a major military leader. Wolfgang Benz also comments "His fate gives an idea of the possibilities the military resistance could have offered had such a charismatic leader of troops been at the helm."

References

Informational notes

Citations

Bibliography

Further reading

 
 
 
 

 
 

 
 
 

 
 
 
 
 
 
 
 
 
 
 
 
 
 
 
 
 
  
  
 
 
 
 
 
 

 
 
 
 

 
 
 

 
 

 
 
 
 
 
 

Bundeswehr
Controversies in Germany
Erwin Rommel
Historical controversies
Role status